The Greene Hills Farm, also known as the Greene County Historical Society Museum, is an historic home which is located in Franklin Township in Greene County, Pennsylvania.

It was listed on the National Register of Historic Places in 1973.

History and architectural features
Built in 1861, the farmhouse is a two-and-one-half-story, nine-bay by four-bay, brick dwelling with a gable roof that was designed in the Georgian style. It was expanded in the 1880s with a two-and-one-half-story, brick addition with a gable roof. Another two-and-one-half-story addition was built sometime around 1900. 

A county home for the aged from the 1880s through 1964, when it closed, the building was renovated starting in 1969, in order to house the Greene County Historical Society Museum's collection and library.

It was listed on the National Register of Historic Places in 1973.

References

External links
Greene County Historical Society website

History museums in Pennsylvania
Houses on the National Register of Historic Places in Pennsylvania
Georgian architecture in Pennsylvania
Houses completed in 1861
Houses in Greene County, Pennsylvania
Museums in Greene County, Pennsylvania
1861 establishments in Pennsylvania
National Register of Historic Places in Greene County, Pennsylvania